Sun Crest. is a brand of flavored carbonated soft drink manufactured by The Dad's Root Beer Company, LLC. of Jasper, Indiana and owned by Hedinger Brands, LLC, except for 6 countries in Asia owned by The Monarch Beverage Company, Inc. of Atlanta, Georgia.  Sun Crest Orange is currently available in fountain service and glass bottles in select markets in the U.S.

History 
The Sun Crest brand of soft drinks was introduced by the National NuGrape Company of Atlanta, Georgia, in 1938 as a flavor line, and sister brand to NuGrape, 2-Way lemon lime, and Kickapoo Joy Juice. Sun Crest was acquired along with NuGrape in 1968 by The Moxie Company (renamed Moxie-Monarch-NuGrape Company and later Monarch Beverage Company). Hedinger Brands, LLC. purchased the Sun Crest brand from Monarch in 2007 along with Dad's Root Beer, Bubble Up and Dr. Wells brands, and licensed the brand to The Dad's Root Beer Company, LLC.  The Dad's Root Beer Company headquarters is located in Jasper, Indiana.

From the 1970s until the early 1990s, Sun Crest branded lime soda, sarsaparilla, grape soda, and cherry soda were sold in the UK at Happy Shopper stores, and delivered in glass bottles by milkmen from the Co-Op. Since 2016, the UK branch of Sun Crest has also begun selling exotic fruit juice such as pineapple, passion fruit, grapefruit, and coconut water in supermarkets like Sainsburys. As of 2021, the only Sun Crest branded soda still available in the UK is sparkling grape juice.

Products 
 Sun Crest Orange Soda
 Sun Crest Strawberry Soda
 Sun Crest Grape Soda
 Sun Crest Pineapple Soda
 Sun Crest Peach
 Sun Crest Cherry
 Sun Crest Grapefruit
 Sun Crest Lemon & Lime 
 Sun Crest chocolate drink

References

External links

Dad's Root Beer Company - Sun Crest page
Monarch Beverage Company - Company History page

American soft drinks
Dad's Root Beer brands
Products introduced in 1938
Orange sodas
Citrus sodas
Grapefruit sodas
Lemon-lime sodas